24 Fore Street is a Grade II listed building in Plympton, Devon, England. Standing on Plympton's main street, it dates to the late 18th century.

Although its interior has not been inspected by Historic England, it was evaluated by Time Team in 1999. In the episode, architectural historian Beric Morley discovered a large timber lintel spanning a fireplace.  A dendochronology sampling dated the timber's felling date (but not the date it was inserted into the fireplace) to around 1290.

References

Grade II listed buildings in Devon
Fore Street 24
18th-century establishments in England